The Višegrad Hydroelectric Power Plant is a hydroelectric power plant in Bosnia and Herzegovina. It began electrical energy generation in 1989. The installed capacity of 3×105 MW is achieved with Kaplan turbines, with an average annual electricity generation of 1 TWh.

References

Hydroelectric power stations in Bosnia and Herzegovina